Hygrolycosa is a genus of wolf spiders (family Lycosidae) first described by Friedrich Dahl in 1908.

Species
, it contains only five species.
Hygrolycosa alpigena Yu & Song, 1988 – China
Hygrolycosa rubrofasciata (Ohlert, 1865) – Palearctic
Hygrolycosa strandi Caporiacco, 1948 – Greece
Hygrolycosa tokunagai Saito, 1936 – China
Hygrolycosa umidicola Tanaka, 1978 – "Japan, Korea?"

References

Lycosidae
Araneomorphae genera
Palearctic spiders
Spiders of Asia
Taxa named by Friedrich Dahl